Glutathione S-transferase theta-1 is an enzyme that in humans is encoded by the GSTT1 gene.

Glutathione S-transferase (GST) theta 1 (GSTT1) is a member of a superfamily of proteins that catalyze the conjugation of reduced glutathione to a variety of electrophilic and hydrophobic compounds. Human GSTs can be divided into five main classes: alpha, mu, pi, theta, and zeta. The theta class includes GSTT1 and GSTT2. The GSTT1 and GSTT2 share 55% amino acid sequence identity and both of them were claimed to have an important role in human carcinogenesis. The GSTT1 gene is located approximately 50kb away from the GSTT2 gene. The GSTT1 and GSTT2 genes have a similar structure, being composed of five exons with identical exon/intron boundaries.

References

Enzymes
Genes